SS Hoihow was a British passenger ship built in 1933 in Hong Kong by the Taikoo Dockyard & Engineering Company of Hong Kong Ltd. in 1933 for The China Navigation Company of London to operate on the Indochina trade.

During World War II, Hoihow was used to carry food to the United Kingdom.

At 02:00 on 1 July 1943, the German submarine  sighted three Allied merchant ships – Hoihow, under Master William Mackensie Christie, among them – in port at Port Louis, Mauritius. U-181′s commanding officer, Korvettenkapitän Wolfgang Lüth, decided to loiter offshore and wait for them to leave port. On the morning of 2 July 1943, two of them put to sea, and U-181 set out in pursuit of the second to leave, which was Hoihow. The four survivors – three crew members and a passenger – were rescued by the American merchant ship , which put them ashore at Montevideo, Uruguay, on 25 July 1943.

References

1933 ships
Ships built in Hong Kong
Cargo liners
World War II merchant ships of the United Kingdom
Ships sunk by German submarines in World War II
Maritime incidents in July 1943
World War II shipwrecks in the Indian Ocean